A Quest for Simbilis is a novel by Michael Shea published in 1974.

Plot summary
A Quest for Simbilis is a novel in which the plot is a sequel to Jack Vance's The Eyes of the Overworld (a.k.a. Cugel the Clever).

Reception
Dave Langford reviewed A Quest for Simbilis for White Dwarf #74, and stated that "Vance can be relied on for unwavering polish, but tends to recycle old plot elements; Shea, though more rough-hewn, adds innovations plus a touch of true, murky hellfire from an imagination fuelled by Hieronymus Bosch."

Reviews
Review by Dave Bischoff (1974) in Thrust, #5 1974

References

1974 American novels
1974 fantasy novels
DAW Books books